Artyom Andreyevich Vasev (born 30 March 1995) is a former Russian football defender.

Club career
He made his debut in the Russian Football National League for FC Neftekhimik Nizhnekamsk on 7 July 2013 in a game against FC Angusht Nazran.

References

External links
 
 
 Career summary by sportbox.ru

1995 births
Living people
Russian footballers
Association football defenders
FC Neftekhimik Nizhnekamsk players